General Schulz may refer to:

Adelbert Schulz (1903–1944), German Wehrmacht major general
Erwin Schulz (1900–1981), German SS brigadier general
Friedrich Schulz (1897–1976), German Wehrmacht general
Johannes Schulz (1892–1943), German Wehrmacht major general (posthumously promoted)
Karl-Heinrich Schulz (1906–1986), German Luftwaffe major general
Karl-Lothar Schulz (1907–1972), German Luftwaffe major general
Ludwig Schulz (1896–1966), German Luftwaffe major general

See also
Fritz von Scholz (1896–1944), Waffen-SS lieutenant general
Georg Scholze (1897–1945), German Wehrmacht major general
Franz-Joseph Schulze (1918–2005), German Army general
Werner Schulze (1895–1966), German Wehrmacht major general
General Schultz (disambiguation)